Piotr Więcek (b. 27 July 1990 in Płock, Poland) is a Polish drifting driver, currently a Worthouse Drift Team member.

Career 
He began drifting in 2010. He signed a contract in 2011 with the Budmat Auto RB Team, which later became Budmat Auto Drift Team. He is associated with yellow Nissans - mainly models 200SX and Skyline R34. He competed for three titles of European drifting league champion Drift Masters Grand Prix - in 2014, 2015 and 2016.

He became a member of the Worthouse Drift Team in 2017. Together with their teammate James Deane, they began racing in Formula D (FD), considered to be the best drifting league in the world. Events take place in the United States.

Piotr Więcek finished the 2017 season in Formula D as rookie of the Year 2017 and as one of only three drivers in the history of FD who won a single round in the first season of starts.

In 2020, due to the COVID-19 Pandemic, the Worthouse drift team withdrew from competition. In the same statement, it was announced that James Deane would no longer be competing with Worthouse.

Więcek won DMEC championship on 2022.

Sporting achievements

Season 2011 
5th place - Polish Drifting Championships - Poznan Track (Nissan 200SX S14)

Season 2012 
4th place - Polish Drifting Championships - Płock Orlen Arena (Nissan 200SX S14)

6th place - Polish Drifting Championships - Kielce, Copper Mountain Track (Nissan 200SX S14)

Season 2013 
2nd place - Polish Drifting Championships - Poznan Track (Nissan 200SX S14)

Season 2014 
1st place - Drift Allstars - London Stratford Olympic Ground (Nissan 200SX S14)

4th place - Polish Drifting Championships - Kielce, Copper Mountain Track (Nissan 200SX S14)

1st place - Polish Drifting Championships - Poznan Track (Nissan 200SX S14)

1st place in the general classification - Drift Masters Grand Prix (Nissan 200SX)

Season 2015 
1st place in the general classification - Drift Masters Grand Prix (Nissan 200SX)

Season 2016 
2nd place - Drift Allstars - Germany Eurospeedway-Lausitz (Nissan Skyline)

1st place in the general classification - Drift Masters Grand Prix (Nissan 200SX)

Season 2017 
3rd place - 3rd round of Drift Masters Grand Prix (Nissan Skyline)

1st place - 8th round of Formula Drift Irwindale, California, USA (Nissan S15)

Season 2018 
3rd place - 1st round of Formula Drift Long Beach, California, USA (Nissan S15)

1st place - 1st round of Motegi Super Drift Challenge 2018, Long Beach, California, USA (Nissan S15)

1st place - 1st round of Motegi Super Drift Challenge 2018, Long Beach, California, USA (Nissan S15)

5th place - 2nd round Formula Drift Orlando, Florida, USA (Nissan S15)

4th place - 3rd round of Formula Drift Atlanta, Georgia, USA (Nissan S15)

3rd place - 5th round of Formula Drift Monroe, Washington, USA (Nissan S15)

4th place - 6th round of Formula Drift, St. Louis, Illinois, USA (Nissan S15)

4th place - Red Bull Drift Shifters, Liverpool, England (Nissan Skyline)

Season 2020 

2nd place - 1st round of Drift Masters European Championship (King of Riga), Riga, Latvia (Nissan S15)

Season 2021 

1st place - 1st round of Drift Masters European Championship, Greinbach, Austria (Nissan S15)

1st place - 2nd round of Drift Masters European Championship, Greinbach, Austria (Nissan S15)

2nd place - 3rd round of Drift Masters European Championship, Riga, Latvia (Nissan S15)

1st place - 4th round of Drift Masters European Championship, Riga, Latvia (Nissan S15)

References 

Polish motorsport people
Drifting drivers
Formula D drivers
1990 births
Living people
Sportspeople from Płock